Paul Hennessy may refer to:

 Paul Hennessy (trainer), Irish greyhound trainer
 Paul Hennessy (8 Simple Rules), a character from the TV series 8 Simple Rules